The Gambian ambassador in Washington, D.C. is the official representative of the Government in Banjul to the Government of the United States, he has regularly coacredition at the governments in Ottawa (Canada), Brasília (Brazil), Mexico City (Mexico) and Caracas (Venezuela).

Embassy 
The Embassy of The Gambia in Washington, D.C. is located at 5630 16th Street. It is also listed as being at 2233 Wisconsin Avenue.

List of representatives

References 

Ambassadors of the Gambia to the United States
United States
Gambia, The
1979 establishments in the Gambia